The Karchag Phangthangma (dkar-chag 'Phang-thang-ma) is one of three historically attested Tibetan imperial catalogues listing translations mainly of Sanskrit Buddhist texts translated to Tibetan. The title, in Tibetan dkar-chag 'phang-thang-ma, simply means the catalogue/index (karchag) from Phangthang (a place in Central Tibet).

The Karchag Phang-tangma (dkar-chag 'Phang-thang-ma) was sponsored by the Tibetan emperors in the 9th century. Studies of the imperial catalogue from Denkar (dkar-chag lDan-dkar-ma) have been conducted by YOSHIMURA (1950); LALOU (1953); and HERRMANN-PFANDT (2008). For studies of the catalogue from 'Phang-thang see: HALKIAS (2004), EISHIN (2005a/2005b), and DOTSON (2007). The Karchag Chimpuma composed in Samye (dkar-chag bSam-yas mChims-phu-ma) has not been found. These imperial catalogues are considered historical documents and prototypes of the Tibetan Buddhist canon.

References

Yoshimura, Shyuki. 1950. The Denkar-ma: An Oldest Catalogue of the Tibetan Buddhist Canons. Kyoto: Ryukoku University.
Lalou, Marcelle. 1953. “Les textes bouddhiques au temps du roi Khri-sroṅ-lde-bcan. Contribution à la bibliographie du Kanjur et du Tanjur.” Journal Asiatique, 241: 313–53.  
Halkias, Georgios. 2004. ‘Tibetan Buddhism Registered: An Imperial Catalogue from the Palace Temple of ’Phang-thang.’ Eastern Buddhist, XXXVI, 1 & 2: 46–105.

Kawagoe Eshin 川越英真 (2005a). “『パンタン目録』の研究 A Study of dKar chag 'Phang thang ma.” 日本西蔵学会会報 Japanese Association for Tibetan Studies 51: 115 – 131. 
Kawagoe Eishin 川越英真 (2005b). Dkar chag ʼPhang thang ma. Sendai: 東北インド・チベット研究会Tōhoku Indo-Chibetto Kenkyūkai. 
 Dotson, Brandon. 2007. '‘Emperor’ Mu-rug-btsan and the `Phang thang ma Catalogue.' Journal of the International Association of Tibetan Studies, 3 . pp. 1–25. 
Herrmann-Pfandt, Adelheid. 2008. Die lHan kar ma: ein früher Katalog der ins Tibetische übersetzten buddhistischen Texte. Wien: Verlag der österreichischen Akademie der Wissenschaften.

Tibetan culture
Translation publications